Christoph Ananda Probst (6 November 1919 – 22 February 1943) was a German student of medicine and member of the White Rose (Weiße Rose) resistance group.

Early life
Probst was born in Murnau am Staffelsee. His father, Hermann Probst, was a private scholar and Sanskrit researcher, fostered contacts with artists who were deemed by the Nazis to be "decadent". After Hermann's first marriage with Karin Katharina Kleeblatt, Christoph's mother, broke up in 1919, he married Elise Jaffée, who was Jewish. Christoph's sister, Angelika, remembers that her brother was strongly critical of Nazi ideas that violated human dignity. Soon after his second marriage, Hermann Probst, who suffered from depression, committed suicide. How this affected Christoph is unknown, but it evidently contributed to his contempt for Nazi ideology.

Probst attended boarding school at Marquartstein and Landheim Schondorf. It was here that he met Alexander Schmorell, who soon became his best friend. The boarding school was aimed at to fostering Nazi ideas. After completing his schooling at the age of 17, Probst enrolled in the Luftwaffe. After military service, he began medical studies with great earnestness. At the age of 21, he married Herta Dohrn, with whom he had three children: Michael, Vincent and Katja.

The White Rose
The White Rose was the name of a resistance group in Munich in the time of the Third Reich. The activities of the White Rose began in June 1942. From the end of that month until mid-July that same year, Hans Scholl and Alexander Schmorell wrote the group's first four leaflets. Quoting extensively from the Bible, Aristotle and Novalis, as well as Goethe and Schiller, the iconic poets of the German middle classes at the time, they appealed to what they considered the German intelligentsia, believing that the latter would be easily convinced by the same arguments that had appealed to themselves. The leaflets were left in telephone books in public phone booths, mailed to professors and students, and taken by courier to other universities for distribution. Christoph Probst came rather late into the White Rose since he did not belong to the same student corps as Hans Scholl, Alexander Schmorell and Willi Graf, and he stayed for the most part in the background as, being married, he had to think of his family. Probst belonged — along with the Scholl siblings, Graf, and Schmorell — to the innermost circle, which came to include also university professor Kurt Huber. The members of White Rose put together, printed and distributed, a total of six leaflets, at the risk of their lives. In January 1943, Probst wrote a seventh leaflet, which he gave to Hans Scholl. However, it was never distributed.

Capture, trial, and execution 
On 18 February 1943, Sophie and Hans Scholl went to the Ludwig Maximilian University to leave out flyers for the students to read. They were seen by Jakob Schmid, a janitor at the University who was also a Gestapo informer. Schmid alerted the Gestapo, who closed down the University until the Scholls could be apprehended. The draft of a seventh pamphlet that had been written by Christoph Probst was found in the possession of Hans Scholl at the time of his arrest by the Gestapo. While Sophie Scholl managed to get rid of incriminating evidence before being taken into custody, Hans attempted to destroy the draft leaflet by tearing it apart and swallowing it. However, the Gestapo recovered enough of it to read the contents of the leaflet. When pressed, Hans Scholl gave up the name of Christoph. As he said in his second interrogation:The piece of paper that I tore up following my arrest this morning originated with Christoph Probst. He resides in Innsbruck, [and is with] an air force Student Company. I have been friends with Probst for several years.

One day, I suggested to him that he should put his thoughts about current events in writing for me. This was after New Year 1942/43 when Probst visited me in Munich. We talked about this possibility at that time, namely in my apartment. Schmorel [sic], I, and Probst have comprised a circle of friends for years now. Schmorel [sic] was not present at this last meeting. He knows nothing of this entire matter. With regards to political matters, I exercised influence on Probst. Without my influence, he undoubtedly would never have reached these conclusions. I have withheld this acknowledgment for so long because Probst's wife is currently confined to bed with puerperal fever following the birth of their third child. He told me this himself, namely the last time that we met. I must say that I commissioned Probst to put his thoughts in writing a while ago. The last time we met – at the beginning of January 1943 – he gave me the piece of paper that I tore up today. I must expressly note that I said nothing to Probst about using his written notes for producing leaflets. I similarly assume that Probst was absolutely in the dark about the actions I had undertaken...All other persons with the exception of Probst are in my opinion not guilty.On February 20, 1943, Probst went to pick up his paycheck before travelling to see his wife Herta and his newly born daughter, Katja. While in the office to collect his check, he was apprehended by the Gestapo, who asked him to change into street clothes before taking him to prison. He had asked for clemency during interrogation. He also requested a trial for the sake of his wife and his three children, aged three and two years and four weeks old.

On February 22, 1943, Probst, Sophie Scholl, and Hans Scholl were put to a trial before Judge Roland Freisler. The latter was known as the "Hanging judge" as about 90% of his trials ended in death sentences. At the conclusion of a  trial lasting two hours, the accused were sentenced to death. They were originally scheduled to be executed by hanging in public, but the prison officials were worried that they would be made into political martyrs if their execution was public. Because of this, it was decided they would be guillotined. Shortly before his death, Christoph asked to be baptized into the Catholic faith. He was baptized a few minutes before his death. They were all beheaded by guillotine by executioner Johann Reichhart in Munich's Stadelheim Prison. Sophie was executed at 5 pm, while Hans was executed at 5:02 PM and Christoph was executed at 5:05 PM. The execution was supervised by Walter Roemer, the enforcement chief of the Munich district court. Prison officials were impressed by the condemned prisoners' bravery, and let them smoke cigarettes together before they were executed.

Probst's wife Herta was ill with childbed fever at the time. She was not informed of his capture, as the hospital nurses did not wish to alarm her. Herta  helped write a petition for clemency the same day he was executed.

Legacy
His grave is to be found in the graveyard  "Am Perlacher Forst", which is adjacent to the place of his execution.

On 3 November 1999, Christoph Probst was included in a semi-official commemorative book published by the German Catholic bishops.
For his 100th birthday in 2019, the barracks of the Joint Medical Service of the Bundeswehr, north of Munich were named after him. In Germany, there are currently a total of 8 schools and residences named after him.

In film
Christoph Probst was portrayed by Florian Stetter in the film Sophie Scholl: The Final Days (2005).

See also
 List of peace activists

References

Bibliography 
 Karin Amann, Thomas Ernst et al.: Die Weiße Rose – Gesichter einer Freundschaft. Arti Grafiche fiorin SpA, Mailand. (in German)
 Lilo Fürst-Ramdohr: Freundschaften in der Weißen Rose. Verlag Geschichtswerkstatt Neuhausen, München 1995, . (in German)
 Jakob Knab: Die innere Vollendung der Person. Christoph Probst. In: Detlef Bald, Jakob Knab (Hrsg.): Die Stärkeren im Geiste. Zum christlichen Widerstand der Weißen Rose. Essen 2012. (in German)
 Christiane Moll (Hrsg.): Alexander Schmorell, Christoph Probst. Gesammelte Briefe. Lukas Verlag, Berlin 2011, . (in German)
 Peter Normann Waage: Es lebe die Freiheit! – Traute Lafrenz und die Weiße Rose. Urachhaus, Stuttgart 2012, . (in German)
 Inge Scholl: Die Weiße Rose. Fischer Verlag, . (in German)
 Robert Volkmann, Gernot Eschrich und Peter Schubert: …damit Deutschland weiterlebt. Christoph Probst 1919–1943. (Christoph-Probst-Gymnasium) Gilching 2000, . (in German)

External links
 

1919 births
1943 deaths
People from Garmisch-Partenkirchen (district)
Converts to Roman Catholicism from atheism or agnosticism
German pacifists
Executed students
Former atheists and agnostics
German Roman Catholics
Executed German Resistance members
Executed activists
People executed by Nazi Germany by guillotine
Ludwig Maximilian University of Munich
Roman Catholics in the German Resistance
White Rose members
People from Bavaria executed by Nazi Germany
People executed by Nazi courts